William James McAvoy (October 16, 1884 – September 17, 1956) was an American football, basketball, and baseball coach.  He served as the head football coach at the University of Delaware (1908–1916, 1922–1924), Drexel University (1920–1921), and the University of Vermont (1925–1927), compiling a college football record of 52–70–14.

Head coaching record

Football

Basketball

See also
 List of college football head coaches with non-consecutive tenure

References

External links
 

1884 births
1956 deaths
American football fullbacks
Basketball coaches from Pennsylvania
Delaware Fightin' Blue Hens athletic directors
Delaware Fightin' Blue Hens baseball coaches
Delaware Fightin' Blue Hens football coaches
Delaware Fightin' Blue Hens men's basketball coaches
Drexel Dragons football coaches
Drexel Dragons men's basketball coaches
Haverford Fords men's basketball coaches
Lafayette Leopards baseball players
Lafayette Leopards football players
Lafayette Leopards men's basketball coaches
People from Hazleton, Pennsylvania
Players of American football from Pennsylvania
Vermont Catamounts football coaches
Vermont Catamounts men's basketball coaches